Krishna Nee Begane Baro is a famous classical song in Kannada language. It is composed in Raga Yamunakalyani by Vyasatirtha. The Tala is Misra chapu.

Composer and Singer
Vyasaraya Tirtha or Vyasatirtha (1460–1539) (also known as Vyasaraja, Vyasaraayaru), a Haridasa, was born at Bannur in the Mysore District of Karnataka state. He is regarded as one of the foremost dialecticians in the history of Indian philosophy. He belonged to the Dvaita school of Madhvacharya. He along with Jayatirtha, helped in systematizing Dvaita into an established school of Vedic thought. Vyasatirtha's genius lay in his clear understanding and exposition of all his opposing schools of thought, for which even his opponents admired him. He was a master at debate and dialogue in logic and philosophy.

Lyrics

Lyrics in Latin script 

Krishna Nee Begane Baro
Begane Baro Mukhavanne Toro
Krishna Nee Begane Baro

Kalalanduge Gejje, Neelada Bavuli
Neelavarnane Natyavanaduta Baro
Krishna Nee Begane Baro

Udualli Udigejje, Beralalli Ungura
Koralalli Haakida Vaijayantiya Maale
Krishna Née Begane Baro

Kasi Pitambara, Kaiyalli Kolalu
Pusida Shreegandha Mayyolagamagama!
Krishna Nee Begane Baro

Tayige Bayalli Jagavannu Thorida
Jagadoddharaka Namma Udupi Shri Krishna.....
Krishna Nee Begane Baro

Lyrics in Kannada script 

ಕೃಷ್ಣ ನೀ ಬೇಗನೇ ಬಾರೋ ||ಪ||

ಬೇಗನೆ ಬಾರೋ ನೀ ಮುಖವನ್ನು ತೋರೋ ||ಅ.ಪ||

ಕಾಲಾಲಂದುಗೆ ಗೆಜ್ಜೆ ನೀಲದ ಭಾವುಲಿ
ನೀಲವರ್ಣನೆ ನಾಟ್ಯವಾಡುತ ಬಾರೋ ||1||

ಉಡಿಯಲ್ಲಿ ಉಡುಗೆಜ್ಜೆ ಬೆರಳಲ್ಲಿ ಉಂಗುರ
ಕೊರಳಲ್ಲಿ ಹಾಕಿದ ವೈಜಯಂತಿಮಾಲೆ ||2||

ಕಾಶೀ ಪೀತಾಂಬರ ಕೈಯಲ್ಲಿ ಕೊಳಲು
ಪೂಸಿದ ಶ್ರೀ ಗಂಧ ಮೈಯೊಳು ಘಮಘಮ ||3||

ತಾಯಿಗೆ ಬಾಯಲ್ಲಿ ಜಗವನ್ನು ತೋರಿದ
ಜಗದೋದ್ಧಾರಕ ನಮ್ಮ ಉಡುಪಿ ಶ್ರೀ ಕೃಷ್ಣ ||4||

Raaga
Yamunakalyani (janya of Mechakalyani, the 65th melakarta)
Arohana: S R2 G3 P M2 P D2 S
Avarohana: S D2 P M2 P G3 R2 S

See also
Carnatic Music

References

Shyam Baba All Bhajan Lyrics

External links
Meaning of the song
Rendition of the song, Kavya Limaye, Deepak Pandit and the Budapest Symphony Orchestra, Sufiscore (via Youtube), 16 September 2022.

Carnatic compositions
Kannada-language songs
Haridasa
Shreya Ghoshal songs